Hafizullah Emadi is an Afghan author, independent scholar and works as a development consultant for international non-governmental organizations. Most recently, he lives in California and works in Kabul, Afghanistan.

Biography
He was born in the Shibar District, Bamyan Province of Afghanistan.

After receiving his Doctor of Philosophy from the University of Hawaiʻi at Mānoa in 1988, Emadi taught in the University of Hawaii system, joined the East-West Center's International Relations Program as a Fellow in 1990, and was awarded a fellowship at the Woodrow Wilson Center in 1999.

He monitored the Afghanistan elections in 2004.

Publications
Emadi has written books and articles on Islamic and Middle Eastern politics and culture, including:

Dynamics of Political Development in Afghanistan: The British, Russian, and American Invasions
Politics of Development and Women in Afghanistan
China's Foreign Policy toward the Middle East
Afghanistan's Gordian Knot: An Analysis of National Conflict and Strategies for Peace

Articles
Published numerous articles on state, gender, modernization and nation-building in Eastern Europe, the Middle East and Central Asia. Examples of articles include:

“From Concealment of their Faith to Active Propagation of the Faith: Afghanistan’s Christians and its Diaspora Community.” International Journal of Minority and Group Rights, 29 (2022): 504-527.
“ Social Movements for Change: An End to Authoritarian Rule in the Ismaili Community of Baghlan, Afghanistan.” Asian Profile, 49:3 (September 2021): 249-269.
"The Politics of Homosexuality: Perseverance of Lesbian, Gay, Bisexual and Transgender (LGBT) Community in a Repressive Social Milieu in Afghanistan." International Journal of Minority and Group Rights, 26 (2019): 242-260.
"End of a Princely State in Hunza, Pakistan: Modernization of a Peripheral Community." Journal of Culture, Society and Development, 39 (2018): 18-29. 
"Bahais of Afghanistan: Endurance and Resilience in a Preclusive Environment." Asian Profile, 46:1 (March 2018): 39-49.
"Syria in the Vortex of US-Russia’s Quest for Domination in the Middle East." AAKROSH, Asian Journal on Terrorism and Internal Conflicts. 20: 75 (April 2017): 6-22.
"The Ahmadiyyas of Afghanistan: Socio-Political Repression and Dissimulation of their Faith." Asian Profile. 44:5 (October 2016): 417-428. 
"Women in the Post-Taliban Afghanistan: Dialectics of Oppression and Token Recognition.” Race, Class and Gender. 22: 3-4 (2015): 244-259.
"The United States and the Islamic State: Surreptitious Relationship." AAKROSH, Asian Journal on Terrorism and Internal Conflicts. 19: 72 (July 2016): 59-78.
"The US and the Axis of Extremism in Afghanistan: From Alliance to Antipathy." AAKROSH, Asian Journal on Terrorism and Internal Conflicts. 19: 70 (January 2016): 10-28.
"Repression and Endurance: Anathematized Hindu and Sikh Women of Afghanistan." Nationalities Papers: The Journal of Nationalism and Ethnicity. 44: 4 (2016): 628-645.
"Politics of Alienation: The Disappearance of Afghanistan's Jewish Community." Asian Profile. 43: 4 (August 2015): 303-316.
"The US and Syria: Clawing Back the Sphinx of Damascus." AAKROSH, Asian Journal on Terrorism and Internal Conflicts. 18: 67 (April 2015): 7-23.
Society and Reformation in the Ismaili Community of Bamiyan, Afghanistan." Asian Profile, 42: 3 (.June 2014): 245-260.
"Minorities and Marginality: Pertinacity of Hindus and Sikhs in a Repressive Environment in Afghanistan." Nationalities Papers: The Journal of Nationalism and Ethnicity, 42:2 (2014): 307-320. 
"Rebuilding Afghanistan Five Years After the Collapse of the Taliban, Contemporary Review 288.1683 (Winter 2006), p. 430.
"Libya: The Road to Regime Change.” Global Dialogue, 14: 2 (Summer/Autumn 2012). http://www.worlddialogue.org.
"Palestinian Struggle for an Independent State: Retrospect and Prospects." Contemporary Review, 294: 1705 (June 2012): 159-168.
"Requiem for the Baath Party: Struggle for Change and Freedom in Syria." Mediterranean Quarterly, 22: 4 (2011): 62-79.
"Egypt: The Fall of a Modern Pharaoh." Contemporary Review, 293: 1700 (Spring 2011): 1-9.
"The Ismailis of Afghanistan: Strategies of Adaptation and Transformation." Afghanistan, 14: 5 (1386/2007): 14-38.
"Afghanistan: the Tajik Ismailis of Takhar – an end to Isolation." Contemporary Review, 291: 1694 (Autumn 2009): 288-298.
"Establishment of Afghanistan's Parliament and the Role of Women Parliamentarians: Retrospect and Prospects." Internationales Asienfourm, 39: 1-2 (2008): 5-19.
"Modernizing One Village in Afghanistan.' Contemporary Review, 290:1689 (Summer 2008): 137-150.
"Complexities of Nation-building: Struggle for Making a Functioning Democracy in Afghanistan." Afghanistan, Volumes 1-3, Number 4 (1385/2006):12-26.
"Nahzat-e-Nawin: Modernization of Badakhshani Ismaili Communities of Afghanistan." Central Asian Survey, 24:2 (June 2005):165-189.
"A Progressive Alternative Development Strategy Proposal for Afghanistan." Peace Research, 36: 2 (2004): 23-38.
"Nation-Building in Afghanistan.” Contemporary Review, 283: 1652 (September 2003): 148-155.
"Kabul." Encyclopedia of Urban Cultures: Cities and Cultures Around the World, Volume 2 (Danbury: Connecticut: Grolier Publishing Company, 2002), pages 437-445.
"Struggle for Recognition: Hazara Ismaili Women and Their Role in the Public Arena in Afghanistan" Asian Journal of Women’s Studies, 8: 2 (2002): 76-103.
"Ethnic Groups and National Unity in Afghanistan." Contemporary Review, 280: 1632 (January 2002): 8-15.
"Radical Political Movements in Afghanistan and their Politics of Peoples' Empowerment and Liberation." Central Asian Survey. 20:4 (2001): 427-450.
"Shikast-e-Zawlanaha." [Breaking the Shackles]. Mohammad Ali Joya (tr.). Hafta Nama-e-Wahdat [Wahdat Weekly], 18 October 2001, page 6.
"Rebuilding Afghanistan." Contemporary Review, 278: 1623 (April 2001): 200-208.
"The New World Order and Albania's Convoluted Route to Transition in the Free Market Economy." East European Quarterly, 34:3 (September 2000): 361-379.
"Tajikistan's Transition to the World Economy." Contemporary Review, 227:1615 (August 2000): 79-85.
"Praxis of Taqiyya: Perseverance of Pashaye Ismaili Enclave, Nangarhar, Afghanistan." Central Asian Survey, 19:2 (June 2000): 253-264.
"Iran and the Islamists." Contemporary Review, 276: 1608 (January 2000): 5-11.
"Breaking the Shackles: Political Participation of Hazara Women in Afghanistan." Asian Journal of Women's Studies, 6:1 (2000): 143-161. 
"Albania's Transition to Capitalism." Contemporary Review, 274: 1600 (May 1999): 225-229.
"The New Word Order or Disorder: Armed Struggle in Afghanistan and United States' Foreign Policy Objectives." Central Asian Survey, 18:1(1999): 49-64.
"Radical Islam, Jihad and Civil War in Afghanistan." Internationales Asienforum, 30: 1 & 2 (1999): 5-26.
"The Infitah Politics and the Failure of Political Islam in Syria." Contemporary Review, 273:1595 (December 1998): 290-94.
"The Syrian National Bourgeoisie and Infitah Ideology, 1960-1994." Journal of International Relations, 5:1-2 (July–June 1997-98): 33-51.
"The End of Taqiyya: Reaffirming Religious Identity of Ismailis in Shughnan, Badakhshan and Political Ramification for Afghanistan." Middle Eastern Studies, 34:3 (July 1998): 103-120.
"Politics of Transformation and Ismailis in Gorno-Badakhshan, Tajikistan." Internationales Asienforum, 29:1-2 (1998): 5-22.
"The Hazaras and their Role in the Process of Political Transformation in Afghanistan." Central Asian Survey, 16:3 (1997): 363-387.
"The State and Class Conflict in Modern Iraq, 1950-1992." Journal of International Relations, 3:2 (January–June 1996): 21-36.
"The State and Rural-based Rebellion in Afghanistan." Central Asian Survey, 15:2 (1996): 201-211.
"Exporting Iran’s Revolution: The Radicalization of the Shiite Movement in Afghanistan." Middle Eastern Studies, 31:1 (January 1995): 1-12.
"China’s Ideological Influence and Trade Relations with Iran, 1960-1990." Internationales Asienforum, 26: 1 & 2 (1995): 143-154.
"Ideological Basis of Chinese Foreign Policy: A Review." Journal of International Relations, 2:1 (July–December 1994): 67-80.
"State, Ideology and Islamic Resurgence in Tadjikistan." Central Asian Survey, 13:4 (1994): 565-573.
"China and Iraq: Patterns of Interaction, 1960-1992." Economic and Political Weekly, 29: 53 (December 31, 1994): 3315-3318.
"China and Palestine Resistance Movement, 1960-92." Mediterranean Quarterly, 5:3 (Summer 1994): 81-94.
"Minority Group Politics: The Role of Ismailis in Afghanistan's Politics." Central Asian Survey, 12:3 (1993): 379-392.
"The Last Years of Yugoslavia." Contemporary Review, 263:1534 (November 1993): 233-241.
"Development Strategies and Women in Albania." East European Quarterly, 27:1 (March 1993): 79-96.
"China's Politics and Developments in Afghanistan.” Journal of Asian and African Studies, 28:1 & 2 (January–April 1993): 107-117.
"An Analysis of Gandhi's Politics of Civil Disobedience During India's Independence Movement." World Review, 31:2 (June 1992): 52-59.
"Conflicts in the Middle East: The Kurdish National Question." Contemporary, Review 261:1519 (August 1992): 62-71.
"Women’s Emancipation and Strategy of Development in Albania." Economic and Political Weekly, 27: 19 (May 9, 1992): 999-1002.
"State, Modernization, and the Women's Movement in Afghanistan." Review of Radical Political Economics, 23:3 & 4 (Fall & Winter 1991): 224-243.
"State, Modernization and Rebellion:  U.S.-Soviet Politics of Domination of Afghanistan." Economic and Political Weekly, 26:4 (26 January 1991): 176-184.
"The Era of Transnational Corporations (TNCs) and Albania's Strategy of Self Reliant Development" World Review, 29:3 (September 1990): 35-42.
"Durand Line and Afghanistan-Pakistan Relations." Economic and Political Weekly, 25:28(14 July 1990): 1515-1516.
"An Historical Perspective of the Durand Line and the Future of Afghanistan-Pakistan Relations." World Review, 30:3 (March 1991): 5-12.
"Afghanistan in United States-Soviet Politics." World Review, 28:3 (September 1989): 17-21.
"Resettlement Pattern: The Afghan Refugees in Pakistan." Cultural Survival Quarterly, 12:4 (December 1988): 20-23.
"Afghanistan's Struggle for National Liberation." Studies in Third World Societies, 27 (1986): 17-42.
Hanne Christensen. The Reconstruction of Afghanistan: A Chance for Rural Afghan Women (Geneva: United Nations Research Institute for Social Development, 1990), 90 pp. Reviewed in The Journal of Development Studies, 29:3 (April 1993): 605-606.
Rejoinder to review of State, Revolution and Superpowers in Afghanistan (New York: Praeger Publishers, 1990) in The Middle East Journal, 45:3 (Summer 1991): 557-558.

References

Living people
University of Hawaiʻi at Mānoa alumni
Afghan emigrants to the United States
Year of birth missing (living people)